Young Social Innovators (YSI) is a "social awareness and active citizenship and education programme" for 15- to 18-year-old teens in Ireland. YSI's main goal is to get young people (15-18yrs) involved in action which helps improve the lives of others in their community. YSI involves thousands of young people in Ireland each year in hundreds of projects and social enterprises which are youth-led, team-based and action-focused. Each YSI team is invited to present their project at an annual YSI Speak Out Regional fora. A national showcase of Young Social Innovators and projects also takes place in May each year.

Former winners 
 2002 - Saint Leos College, Carlow - Teenage Motherhood in our Community
 2003 - East Glendalough School, Wicklow Town - Next train 2020
 2004 - Loreto Secondary School, Balbriggan, Co. Dublin - Mosney - a Home from Home? Changing attitudes to asylum seekers and refugees in Ireland
 2005 - Moyne Community School, Moyne, Co. Longford - Don't Drink 'Til You Drop - Think and Stop 
 2006 - St. Vincent's CBS, Glasnevin, Dublin 9 - Can Roses Grow from Concrete?
 2007 - John the Baptist Community School, Limerick - Dead is Easy, Belt Up and Be Safe
 2008 - Cólaiste Mhuire, Ennis, Co. Clare - Stomp Out Bullying
 2009 - Cólaiste Bhríde, Carnew, Co. Wicklow and St. Peter's College, Dunboyne, Co. Meath - The Butterfly Effect
 2010 - Scoil Mhuire Gan Smal, Blarney, Co Cork - The Mill Street Cafe project
 2011 - Mount Mercy College, Cork City, Co. Cork - Divert Your Stride From Suicide
 2012 - Davis College, Mallow, Co. Cork - Forget Me Not
 2013 - Eureka Secondary School, Kells, Co. Meath - Bring Organ Donation into Education
 2014 - Coláiste Mhuire, Ennis, Co. Clare - Beware of I.T.
 2015 - Largy College, Clones, Co. Monaghan - LGBT - Let's Get By Together
 2016 - Portmarnock Community School, Portmarnock, Co. Dublin - Global Citizens Mapping The Future
 2017 - Largy College, Clones, Co. Monaghan - Mend a Mind - It's a Disorder Not a Decision
 2018 -  Ardscoil Mhuire, Corbally, Co. Limerick - Sexting, Get the message #keepitpg 
 2019 - Bush Post Primary School, Dundalk, Co. Louth - Let's talk about consent 
 2020 - Cashel Community School, Cashel, Co. Tipperary - Step Up For Accessibility 
 2021 - Mercy Secondary School, Mounthawk, Tralee, Co. Kerry - Red Flags 'Break the Silence'

Education in the Republic of Ireland